Flavio Alfaro Canton is a canton of Ecuador, in the Manabí Province. Its capital is Flavio Alfaro. Its population at the 2001 census was 25,390.

Demographics
Ethnic groups as of the Ecuadorian census of 2010:
Mestizo  79.7%
Montubio  13.7%
Afro-Ecuadorian  3.9%
White  2.6%
Indigenous  0.1%
Other  0.1%

References

Cantons of Manabí Province